Stewardship council may refer to:

 Delta Stewardship Council (since 2010), charged with creating a development plan for the Sacramento-San Joaquin River Delta, California, U.S.
 Forest Stewardship Council (since 1993), a non-profit organization which promotes responsible forest management
 Marine Stewardship Council (since 1996), a non-profit organization which sets sustainable fishing standards
 Aquaculture Stewardship Council (since 2010), a non-profit organization which promotes sustainable aquaculture

See also 
 Stewardship